Redbridge railway station is a small station in the Redbridge area of Southampton, England. The station is located at the junction of the Wessex Main Line, towards  and the South West Main Line towards .

The station is operated by South Western Railway and served by the hourly  to  via  'Figure of Six' local service. A few peak-hour stopping trains on the London Waterloo to  main line route also call here.

In the late 19th and early 20th centuries, Redbridge station was a key location in the movement of gunpowder manufactured in the New Forest.

References

External links

Local Rail Information

Railway stations in Southampton 
DfT Category F2 stations
Railway stations in Great Britain opened in 1847
Former London and South Western Railway stations
Railway stations served by South Western Railway
1847 establishments in England